The following are the association football events of the year 1890 throughout the world.

Events
The first Scottish Football League competition is inaugurated. The ten founder members are Abercorn, Cambuslang, Celtic, Cowlairs, Dumbarton, Hearts, Rangers, St Mirren, Third Lanark and Vale of Leven. An eleventh team Renton was also a founder member but was subsequently expelled for professionalism, the game being officially amateur at the time.
Royal Arsenal move from the Manor Ground to the nearby Invicta Ground.

Clubs founded in 1890

England
Chertsey Town F.C.
Fleet Town F.C.
Forest Green Rovers F.C.
Grays Athletic F.C.
Shildon A.F.C.
Weymouth F.C.

Spain
 Sevilla FC

Switzerland
 Servette FC

Winners club national championship
England: Preston North End
Scotland: Queen's Park

International tournaments
1890 British Home Championship (February 8 – April 5, 1890)
Shared by England and Scotland

Births
 11 April – Felix von Heijden (d. 1982), Netherlands international (1920).
 20 August – Caesar ten Cate (d. 1972), Netherlands international (1912).
 4 December – Alex Donaldson (d. 1972), Scotland international forward in six matches (1914–1922).

References

 
Association football by year